Ribes austroecuadorense is a species of plant in the currant family. It is endemic to Ecuador.

Its natural habitat is subtropical or tropical high-altitude shrubland.

References

austroecuadorense
Endemic flora of Ecuador
Vulnerable plants
Plants described in 1998
Taxonomy articles created by Polbot